Blackout! 2 is the second studio album by American hip hop duo Method Man & Redman. It was their first collaborative album in eight years. The album was released on May 19, 2009 under Def Jam. It debuted at #7 on the U.S. Billboard 200 and at #64 on the French Album Charts. The album has sold 178,608 copies in the United States by December 12, 2010, according to SoundScan.

Background 
Blackout! 2 was  announced in 2007 by Redman and was originally scheduled for release in 2008, but its release was pushed back a number of times due to numerous reasons. It was finally released on May 19, 2009. It was released on the same days as Eminem's sixth studio album Relapse and Busta Rhymes's eighth studio album Back on My B.S..  After touring on the Still High Tour with Termanology, The Alchemist, Havoc (from Mobb Deep), and Evidence, Redman and Method Man finished and set the release date for their highly anticipated sequel.

Method Man stated the reasons for the delay: Giving his take on the delay, Redman stated:

Music

Recording and production 
The album features production from Pete Rock and Erick Sermon, as Method Man and Redman promise to satisfy patient fans. The track "A Yo" that was leaked in March is included on the album. Also the track "City Lights" featuring Bun B leaked over the internet on March 24, 2009. Wu-Tang Clan members Raekwon and Ghostface Killah appear on the album, as well as Def Squad members Erick Sermon, and Keith Murray.

Redman stated about the album's production process to MTV:

Release and promotion 
Blackout! 2 was released 10 years after the Blackout! album, which was placed at the top of a lot of 1999's best album lists.

Entertainment Weekly explained how the two lyricists work so well together:

Method Man and Redman have shot music videos for their singles "A Yo" and "Mrs. International". They also shot a video for the song "How Bout Dat" featuring Ready Roc and Streetlife as a video only single and was released online on September 20, 2009. There was also a fan made video for the song "Dis Is 4 All My Smokers" and was released on May 13, 2009. The song City Lights featuring Bun B was released as an only radio single. At Best Buy, both Blackout! and Blackout! 2 are sold together in a boxed set celebrating the 10th anniversary of Blackout.

Lights Out (Blackout 10 Year Reunion) Mixtape 
As promotion for the new album, Method Man & Redman put a "Ten Year Reunion" mixtape. Featuring several, well-known older songs from the original Blackout! album, it also includes new songs like "Four Minutes to Lock Down" with Raekwon and Ghostface Killah, "Dangerous Mcees," etc. It also featured new singles like "City Lights" with Bun B and "A Yo" with Saukrates. The mixtape was hosted by DJ Green Lantern.

Reception

Commercial performance 
Blackout! 2 was released on May 19, 2009. It debuted at number #7 on the Billboard 200, at number 2 on the Top R&B/Hip-Hop Albums, at number 2 on the Top Rap Albums and digital in charted number 7 on the Digital Albums charts  selling 63,000 copies its first week. The album also charted number 10 on Canadian Albums.

The album fell 11 spots to number 18 on the billboard chart in its second week with sales of 20,000 copies. In its third week the album fell 12 spots landing on number 30 selling 14,000 that week. On its fourth week the album fell 18 spots landing on number 48 with sales of 10,000 copies. The album fell 32 spots it had landed on number 70 selling 7,700 copies in its fifth week.

The album has sold 178,608 copies in the United States by December 12, 2010, according to SoundScan.

Critical response 

Reviews of the album were generally positive. It has a score of 79 out of an overall score of 100 on Metacritic, indicating "generally favorable reviews".

Allmusic.com gave it a four out of five stars stating that: 

HiphopDX.com gave the album a 3.5 stars out of 5, stating that: 

Vibe gave a favorable review, stating that: 

Billboard also gave it a favorable review which stated: 

IGN.com gave the album an 8/10 stated that: 

XXL gave the album a mixed review, giving the album a grade of L out of XXL, stating that:

Track listing

Samples 
BO2 (Intro)

 "Magic Mona" performed by Phyllis Hyman

A-Yo

 "Magic Mona" performed by Phyllis Hyman

City Lights

 "One Day" as performed by UGK

Fathers Day

 "Walking Down Lonely Street" performed by Joe Simon

Mrs. International 

 "Here I Am" performed by The Blue Notes
"Call Me" performed by Tweet

Dis is 4 All My Smokers

 "Ain't No Sunshine" as performed by Nancy Wilson

Four Minutes to Lock Down

 "Echo Park" as performed by Brooklyn Bridge

Charts history

Album chart positions

Singles chart positions

References

External links 
 Blackout! 2 at Metacritic
 Release history at Discogs
 Album Review at About.com
 Album Review at XXL

Albums produced by Buckwild
Albums produced by Pete Rock
Albums produced by Erick Sermon
Albums produced by Havoc (musician)
Albums produced by Rockwilder
Albums produced by DJ Scratch
Albums produced by Bink (record producer)
Def Jam Recordings albums
Method Man albums
Redman (rapper) albums
2009 albums
Sequel albums
Collaborative albums